

Ælfric died ) was a medieval Bishop of Ramsbury.

Ælfric was consecrated between 941 and 949. He died between 949 and 950.

Notes

Citations

References

External links

Bishops of Ramsbury (ancient)
10th-century deaths
Year of birth unknown
10th-century English bishops